Dohlkuh (also Romanized as Dohlḵūh) is a village in Alqurat Rural District, in the Central District of Birjand County, South Khorasan Province, Iran. At the 2006 census, its population was 696, in 191 families.

References 

Populated places in Birjand County